Surf City is a borough in Ocean County, in the U.S. state of New Jersey. As of the 2020 United States census, the borough's population was 1,243, an increase of 38 (+3.2%) from the 2010 census count of 1,205, which in turn reflected a decline of 237 (−16.4%) from the 1,442 counted in the 2000 census. The borough borders the Atlantic Ocean on Long Beach Island.

What is now Surf City was originally formed as Long Beach City borough by an act of the New Jersey Legislature on September 19, 1894, from portions of Stafford Township, based on the results of a referendum held the previous day. The borough was renamed Surf City by a resolution of the Borough Council as of May 26, 1899. The name was changed to avoid confusion with other places on the island and along the Jersey Shore.

History
Present-day Surf City was home to one of the first big boarding hotels on the Jersey Shore, called the Mansion of Health. The area surrounding this hotel was called "Buzby's Place" in the 1830s and 1840s, after one of the owners of the Mansion of Health, Hudson Buzby. The Mansion of Health burned down in 1874, but some old-timers still call the cove at the foot of South First Street on the bay side "Mansion Cove."

In 1875, the 20 or so permanent residents of the area decided to call the area Long Beach City, even though the area was still considered part of Stafford Township. In 1894, Surf City was incorporated, changing its name to Surf City in 1899 after the United States Postal Service required a name change before the town could incorporate, preventing it from being confused with Long Branch in Monmouth County.

Geography
According to the United States Census Bureau, the borough had a total area of 1.32 square miles (3.43 km2), including 0.74 square miles (1.93 km2) of land and 0.58 square miles (1.5 km2) of water (43.94%).

Surf City is also  from the capitol of New Jersey, Trenton.

The borough borders the Ocean County municipalities of Long Beach Township, Ship Bottom and Stafford Township.

Demographics

2010 census

The Census Bureau's 2006–2010 American Community Survey showed that (in 2010 inflation-adjusted dollars) median household income was $63,375 (with a margin of error of +/− $12,908) and the median family income was $74,479 (+/− $16,901). Males had a median income of $58,750 (+/− $18,197) versus $51,000 (+/− $27,120) for females. The per capita income for the borough was $42,677 (+/− $4,230). About 2.9% of families and 5.0% of the population were below the poverty line, including 11.7% of those under age 18 and 4.8% of those age 65 or over.

2000 census
As of the 2000 United States census there were 1,442 people, 706 households, and 420 families residing in the borough. The racial makeup of the borough was 98.06% White, 0.14% African American, 0.21% Native American, 0.35% Asian, 0.42% Pacific Islander, 0.55% from other races, and 0.28% from two or more races. Hispanic or Latino of any race were 1.94% of the population.

There were 706 households, out of which 13.0% had children under the age of 18 living with them, 48.6% were married couples living together, 7.1% had a female householder with no husband present, and 40.4% were non-families. 34.8% of all households were made up of individuals, and 19.4% had someone living alone who was 65 years of age or older. The average household size was 2.04 and the average family size was 2.61.

In the borough the population was spread out, with 12.4% under the age of 18, 5.1% from 18 to 24, 21.6% from 25 to 44, 26.8% from 45 to 64, and 34.1% who were 65 years of age or older. The median age was 53 years. For every 100 females, there were 90.5 males. For every 100 females age 18 and over, there were 88.8 males.

The median income for a household in the borough was $38,190, and the median income for a family was $50,268. Males had a median income of $40,625 versus $25,208 for females. The per capita income for the borough was $26,632. About 5.6% of families and 7.5% of the population were below the poverty line, including 22.1% of those under age 18 and 3.9% of those age 65 or over.

Sports
The Surf City Yacht Club participates in weekly races against other yacht clubs throughout the Island, with many sailors and swimmers ranging in age dedicating their summers to the Yacht Club.

The Surf City Beach Patrol won the Surf City Epic, Lavallette, Ortley Beach, Island Beach State Park, the Midway Beach, and "Islands" Tournaments in 2008, narrowly missing out on victories at Sandy Hook (2nd) and the Ship Bottom (2nd) "State Tournament" losing by only a combined 4.5 points. The SCBP squad were back-to-back LBIBPA Island Champions (2007 & 2008) for the first time in the last 25+ years.  The high point of the season came during the IBSP tournament when Surf City won by 23 points.

Government

Local government 
Surf City is governed under the Borough form of New Jersey municipal government, which is used in 218 municipalities (of the 564) statewide, making it the most common form of government in New Jersey. The governing body is comprised of the Mayor and the Borough Council, with all positions elected at-large on a partisan basis as part of the November general election. The Mayor is elected directly by the voters to a four-year term of office. The Borough Council is comprised of six members elected to serve three-year terms on a staggered basis, with two seats coming up for election each year in a three-year cycle. The Borough form of government used by Surf City is a "weak mayor / strong council" government in which council members act as the legislative body with the mayor presiding at meetings and voting only in the event of a tie. The mayor can veto ordinances subject to an override by a two-thirds majority vote of the council. The mayor makes committee and liaison assignments for council members, and most appointments are made by the mayor with the advice and consent of the council.

, the Mayor of Surf City Borough is Republican Francis R. Hodgson Sr., whose term of office ends December 31, 2023. After serving 46 years on the Borough Council, Hodgson succeeded Leonard T. Connors Jr., who had served as the state senator from the 9th Legislative District and spent 50 years as mayor. Members of the Surf City Borough Council are Council President John H. Klose (R, 2024), Peter M. Hartney (R, 2022), William D. Hodgson (R, 2023), John D. McMenamin (R, 2023;appointed to serve an unexpired term), James B. Russell (R, 2024) and Jacqueline L. Siciliano (R, 2022).

John D. McMenamin was appointed to fill the council seat expiring in December 2023 that was vacant following the resignation of John G. Hadash III that same month.

In January 2016, John G. Hadash III was appointed to fill the seat expiring in December 2017 that had been held by Francis R. Hodgson Sr., until he stepped down in January 2016 to take office as mayor. Hadash served on an interim basis until the November 2016 general election, when voters chose him to serve the balance of the term of office.

Federal, state and county representation 
Surf City is located in the 2nd Congressional District and is part of New Jersey's 9th state legislative district.

 

Ocean County is governed by a Board of County Commissioners comprised of five members who are elected on an at-large basis in partisan elections and serving staggered three-year terms of office, with either one or two seats coming up for election each year as part of the November general election. At an annual reorganization held in the beginning of January, the board chooses a Director and a Deputy Director from among its members. , Ocean County's Commissioners (with party affiliation, term-end year and residence) are:

Commissioner Director John P. Kelly (R, 2022, Eagleswood Township),
Commissioner Deputy Director Virginia E. Haines (R, 2022, Toms River),
Barbara Jo Crea (R, 2024, Little Egg Harbor Township)
Gary Quinn (R, 2024, Lacey Township) and
Joseph H. Vicari (R, 2023, Toms River). Constitutional officers elected on a countywide basis are 
County Clerk Scott M. Colabella (R, 2025, Barnegat Light),
Sheriff Michael G. Mastronardy (R, 2022; Toms River) and
Surrogate Jeffrey Moran (R, 2023, Beachwood).

Politics
As of March 2011, there were a total of 1,030 registered voters in Surf City, of which 166 (16.1%) were registered as Democrats, 433 (42.0%) were registered as Republicans and 427 (41.5%) were registered as Unaffiliated. There were 4 voters registered as Libertarians or Greens. Among the borough's 2010 Census population, 85.5% (vs. 63.2% in Ocean County) were registered to vote, including 94.3% of those ages 18 and over (vs. 82.6% countywide).

In the 2012 presidential election, Republican Mitt Romney received 61.8% of the vote (402 cast), ahead of Democrat Barack Obama with 37.8% (246 votes), and other candidates with 0.3% (2 votes), among the 655 ballots cast by the city's 1,108 registered voters (5 ballots were spoiled), for a turnout of 59.1%. In the 2008 presidential election, Republican John McCain received 60.9% of the vote (485 cast), ahead of Democrat Barack Obama with 37.5% (299 votes) and other candidates with 1.0% (8 votes), among the 797 ballots cast by the borough's 1,078 registered voters, for a turnout of 73.9%. In the 2004 presidential election, Republican George W. Bush received 60.8% of the vote (511 ballots cast), outpolling Democrat John Kerry with 38.0% (320 votes) and other candidates with 0.4% (5 votes), among the 841 ballots cast by the borough's 1,153 registered voters, for a turnout percentage of 72.9.

In the 2013 gubernatorial election, Republican Chris Christie received 82.8% of the vote (448 cast), ahead of Democrat Barbara Buono with 15.9% (86 votes), and other candidates with 1.3% (7 votes), among the 559 ballots cast by the city's 1,070 registered voters (18 ballots were spoiled), for a turnout of 52.2%. In the 2009 gubernatorial election, Republican Chris Christie received 61.2% of the vote (417 ballots cast), ahead of Democrat Jon Corzine with 31.0% (211 votes), Independent Chris Daggett with 5.9% (40 votes) and other candidates with 0.3% (2 votes), among the 681 ballots cast by the borough's 1,043 registered voters, yielding a 65.3% turnout.

Education 
From pre-kindergarten through sixth grade, public school students attend the Long Beach Island Consolidated School District, which also serves students from Barnegat Light, Harvey Cedars, Long Beach Township and Ship Bottom. As of the 2020–21 school year, the district, comprised of two schools, had an enrollment of 215 students and 30.7 classroom teachers (on an FTE basis), for a student–teacher ratio of 7.0:1. Schools in the district (with 2020–21 enrollment data from the National Center for Education Statistics) are 
Ethel Jacobsen School in Surf City with 111 students in pre-kindergarten to second grade and 
Long Beach Island Grade School in Ship Bottom with 125 students in grades 3–6. The district's board of education is comprised of nine members who are directly elected from the constituent municipalities on a staggered basis, with three members elected each year. Of the nine seats, one is elected from Surf City.

Students in public school for seventh through twelfth grades attend the Southern Regional School District, which serves the five municipalities in the Long Beach Island Consolidated School District, along with students from Beach Haven and Stafford Township, as well as students from Ocean Township (including its Waretown section) who attend as part of a sending/receiving relationship. Schools in the district (with 2020–21 enrollment data from the National Center for Education Statistics) are 
Southern Regional Middle School with 902 students in grades 7–8 and 
Southern Regional High School with 1,975 students in grades 9–12. Both schools are in the Manahawkin section of Stafford Township.

Transportation

Roads and highways

No Interstate, U.S. or state highways serve Surf City. The main road serving the borough is County Route 607 (Long Beach Boulevard).

Public transportation
TransportAzumah offers weekend service during the summer season between Midtown Manhattan in New York City and Long Beach Island with a stop at Newark Liberty International Airport.

Ocean Ride local service is provided on the OC9 Long Beach Island route.

The LBI Shuttle operates along Long Beach Boulevard, providing free service every 5 to 20 minutes from 10:00 AM to 10:00 PM. It serves the Long Beach Island municipalities / communities of Barnegat Light, Loveladies, Harvey Cedars, North Beach, Surf City, Ship Bottom, Long Beach Township, Beach Haven and Holgate.

Media
Surf City is served primarily by Philadelphia and New York television stations, Atlantic City and Philadelphia-based radio stations and two daily newspapers, The Press of Atlantic City and Asbury Park Press.

Climate
According to the Köppen climate classification system, Surf City, New Jersey has a humid subtropical climate (Cfa) with hot, moderately humid summers, cool winters and year-around precipitation. Cfa climates are characterized by all months having an average mean temperature > , at least four months with an average mean temperature ≥ , at least one month with an average mean temperature ≥  and no significant precipitation difference between seasons. During the summer months in Surf City, a cooling afternoon sea breeze is present on most days, but episodes of extreme heat and humidity can occur with heat index values ≥ . During the winter months, episodes of extreme cold and wind can occur with wind chill values < .

Ecology
According to the A. W. Kuchler U.S. potential natural vegetation types, Surf City, New Jersey would have a dominant vegetation type of Northern Cordgrass (73) with a dominant vegetation form of Coastal Prairie (20).

Notable people

People who were born in, residents of, or otherwise closely associated with Surf City include:

 Francis L. Bodine (1936–2023), politician who represented the 8th Legislative District in the New Jersey General Assembly from 1994 to 2008
 Christopher J. Connors (born 1956), member of the New Jersey Senate from the 9th Legislative District since 2008, when he succeeded his father
 Leonard T. Connors (1929–2016), politician who served in the State Senate from 1982 to 2008 representing the 9th Legislative District, and served for nearly 50 years as mayor of Surf City, from 1966 to 2015

References

Sources
Lloyd, John Bailey. Eighteen Miles of History on Long Beach Island., Down The Shore Publishing and The SandPaper, Inc., 1994. .

External links

Official web site
Surf City Tourism Information
Surf City Borough municipal information
Surf City Beach Patrol Home Page
Long Beach Island School District

School Data for the Long Beach Island School District, National Center for Education Statistics
Southern Regional School District
Long Beach Island Branch (Surf City) of Ocean County Library

 
1894 establishments in New Jersey
Borough form of New Jersey government
Boroughs in Ocean County, New Jersey
Jersey Shore communities in Ocean County
Long Beach Island
Populated places established in 1894